Filip Kamil Adamski (born 5 January 1983 in Wrocław, Poland) is a German former representative rower. He is a world champion, a dual Olympian and an Olympic gold medallist.

He was in the crew that won the gold medal in the men's eight competition at the 2012 Summer Olympics in London.  Later that year each member of the crew was awarded the Silbernes Lorbeerblatt (Silver Laurel Leaf), Germany's highest sports award, for the achievement. He also finished in 6th place in the coxless four at the 2008 Summer Olympics. His world championship title was won in 2009 in the German men's eight.

References

External links
 
 
 

1983 births
Living people
German male rowers
Polish emigrants to Germany
Sportspeople from Wrocław
Olympic rowers of Germany
Rowers at the 2008 Summer Olympics
Rowers at the 2012 Summer Olympics
Olympic gold medalists for Germany
Olympic medalists in rowing
Medalists at the 2012 Summer Olympics
World Rowing Championships medalists for Germany
Recipients of the Silver Laurel Leaf